Best in the World was a professional wrestling event promoted by Ring of Honor (ROH). The event took place on March 25, 2006. The event was held in New York City at Basketball City.  It was the inaugural event held under the Best in the World name.

Storylines
Best in the World featured twelve professional wrestling matches that involved different wrestlers from pre-existing scripted feuds and storylines. Wrestlers portrayed villains, heroes, or less distinguishable characters in the scripted events that built tension and culminated in a wrestling match or series of matches.

Results

See also
2006 in professional wrestling

References

External links
ROH website

2006 in professional wrestling
Ring of Honor pay-per-view events
Events in New York City
2006 in New York City
2006
Professional wrestling in New York City
March 2006 events in the United States